The D.A. is an American half-hour legal drama that aired Fridays at 8:00-8:30 pm on NBC for the 1971-72 season. It ran from September 17, 1971 to January 7, 1972 and was replaced by Sanford and Son the following week. The show was packaged by Jack Webb's Mark VII Limited for Universal Television and is not to be confused with a show Webb produced in 1959 with a similar name, The D.A.'s Man, which starred John Compton in the lead role.

Synopsis
The D.A. starred Robert Conrad as Deputy District Attorney Paul Ryan, a tough-minded, hard-hitting prosecutor in Los Angeles County who was assisted by criminal investigator Bob Ramirez (Ned Romero). He prosecuted all types of cases under the watchful eye of his supervisor, Chief Deputy District Attorney H. M. "Staff" Stafford (Harry Morgan, who directed at least one episode himself). His opponent was usually Public Defender Katherine Benson (Julie Cobb). During the courtroom segments Ryan also provided a voice-over narration (like Dragnet), which brought the audience in on legal jargon and court procedures and allowed there to be less exposition in the dialogue, which was necessary due to the program's brevity, as most legal dramas have episodes twice the length of that of The D.A..

This program, however, is probably less known for its own storylines than for its lack of station clearances.  Several NBC affiliates refused to air the program (mainly because it ran against ABC's Brady Bunch), choosing instead to take the time period for themselves (usually filling it with syndicated programs). Because of the station defections, NBC cancelled The D.A. in mid-season and replaced it the following week with the highly successful Sanford and Son. It ranked 57th out of 78 shows that season with an average 14.9 rating.

Robert Forward produced the show, which was spun off from two TV-movies produced by Webb's production company, Mark VII Ltd., Murder One from 1969 and Conspiracy to Kill from 1971, both of which fictionalized cases prosecuted by Vincent Bugliosi, world-famous as the prosecutor of Charles Manson.  Bugliosi served as technical advisor on both of the pilot films. In his account of the Manson prosecution, Helter Skelter, Bugliosi stated that Conrad modeled the Ryan character on Bugliosi.

A two-part cross-over episode began on another Webb show, Adam-12, in which officers Malloy (Martin Milner) and Reed (Kent McCord) made an arrest.  In the follow-up episode from The D.A., Ryan handled the eventual prosecution. Co-star Morgan also accompanied Webb's Joe Friday character on the 1967-70 version of Dragnet as Officer Bill Gannon; during the next two seasons, he appeared on Mark VII's Hec Ramsey.

In 1990, producer Dick Wolf dusted off the half-investigation, half-trial format of The D.A. and modified it for his hour-long detective drama Law & Order by eliminating the narration but utilizing instead a Dragnet-style dialog between characters. The D.A. was not the first broadcast network series to use the format: Arrest and Trial'''s 90-minute episodes predate The D.A. by eight years.

Four episodes of the series were combined into a feature-length TV-movie called Confessions of the DA Man. "The People vs. Saydo" was used as the basic plot, and, while Ryan is attempting to get a friend of the defendant to testify, describes previous cases to try to illustrate the importance of testifying.  The cases he recounts are "The People vs. Slovik" because the witness's idealism reminds Ryan of the attorney he faced in that case, "The People vs. Fowler" to illustrate the importance of testifying even when it's difficult (as in the case of the rape victim), and "The People vs. Walsh" to illustrate the dangers faced by police in their daily jobs.  The film first aired January 20, 1978 as a CBS Late Movie.

TV-movies

Episodes

Later TV episodes
Some episodes were later compiled in 1978 as a two-hour TV movie titled Confessions of the D.A. Man which aired on CBS in January 20, 1978, as part of The CBS Late Movie."Other 24 -- no title." (1978, Jan 20). Los Angeles Times

 References 

Notes
Brooks, Tim and Marsh, Earle, The Complete Directory to Prime Time Network and Cable TV Shows (2003) TV Guide Guide to TV 2006'' (2006)

External links 
 
 
 
 
 

1970s American legal television series
1971 American television series debuts
1972 American television series endings
1970s American drama television series
1970s American crime television series
English-language television shows
NBC original programming
Television series by Mark VII Limited
Television series by Universal Television
Television shows set in Los Angeles
Television series about prosecutors